Noblella lochites, also known as Ecuador leaf frog, is a species of frog in the family Strabomantidae. It is found on the Amazonian slopes of the Andes and Cordillera del Cóndor and the Cordillera de Cutucú in Ecuador and Peru; the Peruvian record has been disputed, although it is nevertheless expected that the species occurs in Peru.

Etymology
The specific name lochites is Greek for "a recluse", and refers to its type locality in the comparatively remote Cordillera del Cóndor.

Description
Males measure  and females  in snout–vent length. There is a distinctive charcoal, dark brown, or black facial mask. Tympanumic annulus and membrane are clearly visible. Dorsum has well-defined scapular and sacral chevrons and
pair of suprainguinal spots, although patterns differ among individuals and few specimens are nearly patternless. Venter is diffusely pigmented in adults but mottled in juveniles. There are small circular, white dots scattered across all body surfaces.

Habitat and conservation
The species' natural habitat is cloud forest and old growth and secondary forest. They are active by day, with males occasionally calling, and typically inhabit leaf litter or moss and root-covered sandy areas.

Noblella lochites is a rarely encountered species, possibly because of its secretive habits. Land mines left during the Cenepa War offer protection for its range on the Cordillera del Cóndor.

References

lochites
Amphibians of the Andes
Amphibians of Ecuador
Amphibians of Peru
Taxa named by John Douglas Lynch
Amphibians described in 1976
Taxonomy articles created by Polbot